Buddha Institute of Technology, Gaya also known as BIT, established in 2008, is a private degree engineering college, a unit of Buddha Group of Institutions, situated in Gaya, Bihar, India. It offers undergraduate degree engineering in electrical engineering, mechanical engineering, civil engineering and computer science. This college is affiliated with the Aryabhatta Knowledge University (AKU) for B.Tech. Engineering & SBTE for Diploma (Polytechnic) Engineering.

Courses
 B.Tech
 Diploma (Polytechnic)
 BCA
 BBA
 B.Com

Facilities
 Hostels
 Pitch (sports field) Sports ground
 Indoor games and sports
 Sports venue
 Primary Health Centre (India) & Community health center
 Common room for Teachers
 Cafeteria for Students & Teacher

Admission Process
Enrollment in Buddha Institute of Technology is done through the state level entrance exam BCECE (Bihar Combined Entrance Competitive Examination) or BPTPIA (Bihar Private Technical and Professional Institutions Association).

Polytechnic
 2018 - BPTPIA
 2019 - BCECE
 2020 - BCECE
 2021 - BCECE
 2022 - BCECE

B.Tech
 2018 - BPTPIA
 2019 - BPTPIA
 2020 - BPTPIA
 2021 - BCECE
 2022 - BCECE

See also

References

External links 
 
Aryabhatta Knowledge University

Engineering colleges in Bihar
Colleges affiliated to Aryabhatta Knowledge University
Educational institutions established in 2008
2008 establishments in Bihar